Osorno may refer to:

Places and administrative divisions 
Osorno, Chile, a city in Chile
Osorno Province, a province of Chile 
Osorno (volcano), a 2,661-meters (8700-feet) tall conical volcano, located in Chile
Osorno la Mayor, a municipio in Palencia Province, Castile and León, Spain

Nobility 
Count of Osorno, a Spanish title
Marquis of Osorno, title granted to Ambrosio O'Higgins, 1st Marquis of Osorno

People 
 (1769–1824), Mexican revolutionary active in Zacatlán
Daniel Osorno (born 1979), retired Mexican football player
Guillermo Osorno, Nicaraguan pastor and radio evangelist, founder of the Nicaraguan Party of the Christian Path
Nicolás Osorno, President of Nicaragua from 1 to 5 August 1889

Other 
Osorno Airport, a public use airport near Osorno, Chile
Osorno Pilauco Airport, a public use airport near Osorno, Chile
Osorno Básquetbol, a basketball team in the Liga Nacional de Básquetbol de Chile
Provincial Osorno, a football club based in Osorno, Chile
SS Osorno, a German cargo ship, launched in 1938, beached on 25 December 1943, and permanently destroyed on 26 August 1944